Terry Henderson Jr. OOOOOH TERRY TERRY

College career
He played two seasons for the West Virginia Mountaineers and averaged 8.0 points per game as a freshman. Henderson increased those numbers to 11.7 points and 2.9 rebounds per game as a sophomore while making 17 starts. In 2014 he transferred to NC State, choosing the Wolfpack over Maryland and Richmond. After sitting out a redshirt year per NCAA regulations, he played seven minutes of their first match against William & Mary and broke the ligament of his right knee, which left him out of competition for the rest of the season. Once recovered, in his only full season with the team he averaged 13.8 points and 3.1 rebounds per game and led N.C. State in 3-pointers (78). Henderson applied for a sixth year of eligibility but was denied by the NCAA in May 2017.

Professional career
After not being selected in the 2017 NBA Draft, in September he signed with the Charlotte Hornets to play in the preseason. On October 13, he was cut by the Hornets before the season began, shortly afterwards joining the Greensboro Swarm of the NBA G League. Henderson was invited to play for the Hornets in the 2018 Summer League. He played for Scagliera Verona in Italy during the 2018–19 season and started 19 games with averages of 12.4 points, 2.9 rebounds and 1.4 assists per game. Henderson was acquired by the Greensboro Swarm on February 6, 2020. On February 16, Henderson totaled 13 points, six rebounds, two assists and a block in a loss to the Wisconsin Herd.

On July 14, 2020, he has signed with GTK Gliwice of the PLK.

References

External links
 NC State Wolfpack bio

1994 births
Living people
American expatriate basketball people in Italy
American men's basketball players
Basketball players from Raleigh, North Carolina
Greensboro Swarm players
NC State Wolfpack men's basketball players
Scaligera Basket Verona players
Shooting guards
West Virginia Mountaineers men's basketball players